Phillip Egan (born 9 February 1963) is a former Australian rules footballer who played for the Richmond Football Club and Melbourne Football Club in the Victorian Football League (VFL).

Egan played 125 games for Richmond from 1982 to 1990, and one game for Melbourne in 1991.

Egan was the author of the 2022 external report on Hawthorn Football Club historical racism allegations.

In February 2023, Egan was arrested on historical fraud charges, stemming from alleged conduct at the Murray Valley Aboriginal Co-operative between 2010 and 2012.

References 

 Hogan P: The Tigers Of Old, Richmond FC, Melbourne 1996

External links

Richmond Football Club players
Melbourne Football Club players
Indigenous Australian players of Australian rules football
Australian rules footballers from Victoria (Australia)
1963 births
Living people